Nebularia fastigium is a species of sea snail, a marine gastropod mollusc in the family Mitridae, the miters or miter snails.

Description
The shell size varies between 20 mm and 31 mm

Distribution
This species is distributed in the Indian Ocean along Tanzania and the Mascarene Basin; in the Pacific Ocean along New Zealand

References

 Spry, J.F. (1961). The sea shells of Dar es Salaam: Gastropods. Tanganyika Notes and Records 56
 Cernohorsky W. O. (1976). The Mitrinae of the World. Indo-Pacific Mollusca 3(17) page(s): 494
 Drivas, J. & M. Jay (1988). Coquillages de La Réunion et de l'île Maurice
 Richmond, M. (Ed.) (1997). A guide to the seashores of Eastern Africa and the Western Indian Ocean islands. Sida/Department for Research Cooperation, SAREC: Stockholm, Sweden. . 448 pp

External links
 Gastropods.com : Mitra (Strigatella) fastigium; accessed : 14 December 2010

fastigium
Gastropods described in 1845